The black-winged little yellow bat (Rhogeessa tumida) is a species of vesper bat native to Central America.

Description
The fur is buff or yellowish, ticked with near-black or cinnamon, and is paler on the bat's underside. The flight membranes are hairless, and unusually thick for a bat of its size. The ears are smaller than in many closely related species, and have a prominent scent gland on their upper surface in males that is absent in females.

Biology
Little is known of the habits of biology of the species. Individuals have commonly been caught near streams or rivers, and roost in hollow trees or artificial structures. They are nocturnal, being most active shortly after sunset and just before dawn, and feed on small, flying insects. They have diploid chromosome numbers of 30, 32, 34, and 52. Males produce the most sperm in autumn and early winter, suggesting that mating typically occurs around that time, and pregnant females have been caught between February and April. Historically, evidence of hybridization between the Yucatan yellow bat and the Black-winged little yellow bat has been observed.

Range and habitat
Black-winged little yellow bats are found along much of the eastern coast of Mexico, as far north as southern Tamaulipas, and along the Pacific coast in Chiapas. They are also found across most of Honduras, Guatemala and Belize, in northern and western Nicaragua and in north-western Costa Rica.

References

Rhogeessa
Mammals described in 1866
Taxa named by Harrison Allen
Bats of Central America